Candlesby is a village in the East Lindsey district of Lincolnshire, England.

History
Candleby appears in the Domesday Book as "Calnodesbi", in the Wapentake of Candleshoe.  Although wapentakes were abandoned as local government units in the 1890s, the Candleshoe name lives on as the local Deanery.

Gunby Hall was built around 1700 for Sir William, 3rd Baronet Massingberd, and was the former seat of the Massingberd family. The last in residence was Field Marshal Sir Archibald Montgomery-Massingberd. Today the hall is owned by the National Trust, and is a Grade I listed building.

Ancient finds at Candlesby include a crucifix brooch, armour, swords, and a shield, believed to be Saxon.

Community
The present Candlesby parish church is dedicated to Saint Benedict, and is a Grade II listed building. It was built by E. D. Rainey of Spilsby, in 1838, replacing an earlier church that had become derelict.

Gunby ecclesiastical parish is said to number "27 souls", and is served by St Peter's Church. Rebuilt on medieval foundations in the 1870s the Church is accessible only through the Hall's gardens but it remains the active parish church of Gunby with a service once a month.

A school was built here in 1872, but closed in 1933 with only three children in attendance. 

The village has several daily bus services associated with school travel, and an hourly service to Lincoln and Skegness. The bus stop is adjacent to the Royal Oak public house.

References

External links

National Trust - Gunby Hall

Villages in Lincolnshire
East Lindsey District